Io non protesto, io amo (Italian for I don't protest, I love) is a 1967 Italian "musicarello" film written and directed by Ferdinando Baldi and starring Caterina Caselli and Terence Hill (here credited as Mario Girotti).

Plot

Cast 

 Caterina Caselli as Caterina 
 Mario Girotti as Gabriele
 Bruno Scipioni as  Friar Collisio 
  Pinuccio Ardia as  Giuseppe 
 Giancarlo Cobelli as Filippo 
 Riccardo Del Turco as himself
  Mario De Simone as The Major
  Luisa De Santis as  Dorothy 
 Livio Lorenzon as  Baron Francesco Maria Calò 
  Mario Frera as  Beniamino 
  Nina Larker as  Barbara 
 Enzo Maggio as  Felice 
 Enrico Montesano as  Domenico 
 Tiberio Murgia as  Salvatore 
  Antonella Murgia as  Evelina 
  Rosita Pisano as  Anna Maria

References

External links

Musicarelli
1967 musical comedy films
1967 films
Films directed by Ferdinando Baldi
1960s Italian-language films
1960s Italian films